Stanton James Jackson  (August 27, 1898 – November 28, 1955) was a Canadian ice hockey left winger who played parts of five seasons in the National Hockey League for the Toronto St. Pats, Boston Bruins and Ottawa Senators between 1922 and 1926. He also played several years in different minor leagues, retiring in 1932.

Playing career
Jackson played ice hockey for Amherst Academy in 1916–17 before joining the military in 1917. During his military service, he played for Toronto RFC in the Toronto National Defence League. Upon his return from service Jackson played from 1919 until 1923 in the Maritime Hockey League for the Amherst Ramblers, Halifax Wolverines and Stellarton Professionals. He got a one-game tryout with the Toronto St. Patricks in the 1921–22 season, playing January 4, 1922 against the Ottawa Senators, but returned to Nova Scotia. Jackson signed with the St. Patricks in 1923. After one season with Toronto, Jackson was traded to the Boston Bruins where he played two seasons. During the 1926–27 season, Jackson was traded to the Ottawa Senators, where he played eight games before he was traded to London of the Can-Pro League. Jackson played for various minor league pro teams before finishing his playing career with the Buffalo Bisons in 1931–32. He briefly returned to professional hockey to coach the Miami Beach Pirates in the Tropical Hockey League, before the league folded in 1939.

Career statistics

Regular season and playoffs

Head coaching record

External links
 

1898 births
1955 deaths
Boston Bruins players
Buffalo Bisons (IHL) players
Canadian ice hockey left wingers
Canadian military personnel of World War I
Ice hockey people from Nova Scotia
London Panthers players
New Haven Eagles players
Ottawa Senators (1917) players
People from Cumberland County, Nova Scotia
Philadelphia Ramblers players
Toronto St. Pats players
Canadian military personnel from Nova Scotia